Banadaspus was king of the Iazyges from an unknown date until 174AD. He was overthrown by his people after attempting to make a peace deal with the Roman Empire. Zanticus succeeded him as king of the Iazyges.

References

Citations

Books

2nd-century monarchs in Europe
Sarmatian rulers